David Sellers may refer to:

 David F. Sellers (1874–1949), United States Navy admiral
 David E. Sellers (born 1938), American architect